The Lourdes Gray Wolves are the athletic teams that represent Lourdes University, located in Sylvania, Ohio, in intercollegiate sports as a member of the National Association of Intercollegiate Athletics (NAIA), primarily competing in the Wolverine–Hoosier Athletic Conference (WHAC) for most of its sports since the 2011–12 academic year; while its men's wrestling team competes in the Sooner Athletic Conference (SAC). The Gray Wolves previously competed as an NAIA Independent within the Association of Independent Institutions (AII) during the 2010–11 school year (the same season when they joined the NAIA).

Varsity teams
Lourdes competes in 25 intercollegiate varsity sports: Men's sports include baseball, basketball, bowling, cross country, golf, lacrosse, soccer, tennis, track & field, volleyball and wrestling; while women's sports include basketball, bowling, cross country, golf, lacrosse, soccer, softball, tennis, track & field, volleyball and wrestling; and co-ed sports include competitive cheer, competitive dance and eSports.

History
On January 16, 2008, Lourdes College announced that they would be called the Gray Wolves. An athletic identity was also revealed. In July 2009, Roseanne Gill-Jacobson was named the first athletic director in Lourdes College history. In August 2010, the first home game for any athletic team at Lourdes College was held. The women's volleyball team was victorious over Ohio State University at Marion. On December 19, 2012, it was announced that Lourdes had added men's and women's lacrosse, as well as competitive cheer and dance as sports.

Facilities 
 Russell J. Ebeid Recreation Center – Men's Basketball, Women's Basketball, Men's Volleyball, Women's Volleyball, Esports
 Franciscan Center Gymnasium - Wrestling, Cheerleading
 Wildcat Stadium - Lacrosse, Soccer
 Mercy Field – Baseball
 Gray Wolf Field/Pacesetter Park - Softball
 Sylvania Country Club – Men's Golf, Women's Golf

References

External links
 

Athletics